Zeichen der Zeit ("Sign of the Times") was a music project by various German pop musicians. Their common goal was to express their Christian belief and to make an issue out of it in the secular media. An album of the same title appeared in 2004, and the song "Du bist nicht allein" ("You Are Not Alone") became a substantial hit. The project continued in 2006 with the second album "David Generation", which has fewer contributors in order to give it a more distinct sound.

Members 
 Yvonne Catterfeld
 Ben
 Patrick Nuo
 Rolf Stahlhofen
 Xavier Naidoo
 Cassandra Steen
 Laith Al-Deen
 Claus Eisenmann (Söhne Mannheims)
 Paddy Kelly
 Judy Bailey
 Sarah Brendel
 Claas P. Jambor
 Michael Janz (Beatbetrieb)
 DannyFresh (W4C)
 Mischa Marin (Allee der Kosmonauten)

Christian musical groups
German pop music groups